Julian Green (born 3 November 1965) is a British speed skater. He competed in four events at the 1988 Winter Olympics.

References

External links
 

1965 births
Living people
British male speed skaters
Olympic speed skaters of Great Britain
Speed skaters at the 1988 Winter Olympics
Sportspeople from Birmingham, West Midlands